In Aztec mythology, Yohualticetl, the "Lady of the Night", was a moon goddess and guardian of infants.  She may have been the same as Metztli and Coyolxauhqui and the male moon god Tecciztecatl.

See also
Five Suns (mythology)

Aztec goddesses
Lunar goddesses
Childhood goddesses
Night goddesses